The Novosibirsk State Art Museum is a museum in Tsentralny City District of Novosibirsk, Russia. The building was designed by architect Andrey Kryachkov.

History
The Sibrevcom Building was built in 1926. The building was designed by architect Andrey Kryachkov.

The Novosibirsk State Art Museum exhibits 70 classical and modern artwork annually with average or 150 thousand visitors.

Gallery

See also
 Russian Museum 
 The Museum of Russian Art

References

1926 establishments in Russia
Museums with year of establishment missing
Art museums established in 1926
Art museums and galleries in Russia
Buildings and structures in Novosibirsk
Tsentralny City District, Novosibirsk
Culture in Novosibirsk
Buildings and structures built in the Soviet Union
Cultural heritage monuments of federal significance in Novosibirsk Oblast